Difluoroethylene may refer to:

 1,1-Difluoroethylene
 1,2-Difluoroethylene

See also
Difluoroethane

Organofluorides